The Netherlands national football team ( or simply Het Nederlands elftal) has represented the Netherlands in international men's football matches since 1905. The men's national team is controlled by the Royal Dutch Football Association (KNVB), the governing body for football in the Netherlands, which is a part of UEFA, under the jurisdiction of FIFA. They were sometimes regarded as the greatest national team of the respective generations. Most of the Netherlands home matches are played at the Johan Cruyff Arena, De Kuip, Philips Stadion and De Grolsch Veste.

The team is colloquially referred to as Het Nederlands Elftal (The Dutch Eleven) or Oranje, after the House of Orange-Nassau and their distinctive orange jerseys. Informally the team, like the country itself, was referred to as Holland. The fan club is known as Het Oranje Legioen (The Orange Legion).

The Netherlands has competed in eleven FIFA World Cups, appearing in the final three times (in 1974, 1978 and 2010). They finished runners-up on all three occasions. They have also appeared in ten UEFA European Championship, winning the 1988 tournament in West Germany. Additionally, the team won a bronze medal at the Olympic football tournament in 1908, 1912 and 1920. The Netherlands has long-standing football rivalries with neighbours Belgium and Germany.

History

Beginnings: 1905–1969

The Netherlands played their first international match in Antwerp against Belgium on 30 April 1905, with the players selected by a five-member commission from the Dutch Football Association. After 90 minutes, the score was 1–1. As the match was for the Coupe van den Abeele, it went into extra-time, during which Eddy de Neve scored three times, making the score 4–1 for the Netherlands. Some historians attribute one of the goals scored to Willem Hesselink.

In 1908, the Netherlands competed in their first official tournament appearance at the Summer Olympic in London. They received a bronze medal after losing to Great Britain in the semi-finals, before defeating Sweden in the bronze medal match 2–0. At the Olympic Games in 1912 and 1920, the Netherlands finished with the bronze medal as they lost to Denmark and Belgium in the respective tournament.

The Netherlands reached the semi-finals at the 1924 Summer Olympic in Paris after winning against Romania and Ireland. In the semi-finals, they gave up a one-goal lead, scored by Kees Pijl, to lose 2–1 versus Uruguay and were relegated to the third place playoff for the fourth time, losing to Sweden in a replay.

After being eliminated in the first round at the 1928 Summer Olympic on home turf, they skipped the first World Cup in 1930 due to the cost of travel from Europe to South America. The team made their first appearance at a FIFA World Cup in 1934 where they took on Switzerland. Kick Smit was the first goalscorer for the Netherlands in a World Cup. The team was eliminated in the opening round by Switzerland 3–2. A second appearance at the 1938 World Cup resulted in a first-round elimination against Czechoslovakia.

After the Second World War, the Netherlands qualified for only two international tournament before the 1970s: the 1948 Summer Olympic in Great Britain and the 1952 Summer Olympic in Finland. They suffered early elimination, losing to the hosts in 1948 and Brazil in 1952.

Total football in the 1970s and first golden generation
During the 1970s, total football was invented, pioneered by Ajax and led by playmaker Johan Cruyff and national team head coach Rinus Michels. The Netherlands made significant strides, qualifying for two World Cup finals in the decade. Carlos Alberto, captain of the Brazilian team that won the 1970 FIFA World Cup said, "The only team I've seen that did things differently was Holland at the 1974 World Cup in West Germany. Since then everything looks more or less the same to me ... Their 'carousel' style of play was amazing to watch and marvelous for the game."

In 1974, the Netherlands beat both Brazil and Argentina in the second group stage, reaching the finals for the first time in their history. However, they lost to West Germany in the finals in Munich, despite having gone up 1–0 through Johan Neeskens' early penalty kick before a German had even touched the ball. However, a converted penalty by Paul Breitner and the winner from Gerd Müller, led to a victory for the German.

The 1976 European Championship saw the Netherlands make their first European Championship. Czechoslovakia kept Cruyff and Van Hanegem within arms-length and defeated the Netherlands in extra time. The Netherlands finished in third place after defeating the hosts (Yugoslavia) in extra time.

In 1978, the Netherlands qualified for the World Cup in Argentina. The team was missing Johan Cruyff due to a kidnapping attempt, and Willem van Hanegem. But the squad still had players like Jan Jongbloed, Wim Suurbier and Ruud Krol from the previous World Cup. After finishing runners-up in Group 4 behind Peru, they recorded wins against Austria and Italy to set up a finals with Argentina. After a controversial start, with Argentina questioning the plaster cast on René van de Kerkhof's wrist, the match headed to extra time where the Netherlands lost 3–1 after two extra time goals from Mario Kempes and Daniel Bertoni.

1980s: Decline before European champions
Euro '80 was the last tournament for which the Total Football team qualified. Despite the tournament format being expanded that year they did not advance past the group stage as they finished behind Czechoslovakia by goal difference.

Veterans such as Krol and Rensenbrink retired soon afterwards and the Netherlands hit a low point in their history: they missed the 1982 World Cup in Spain, Euro 1984 in France, and the 1986 World Cup in Mexico; they missed the French tournament by virtue of goals scored when Spain scored twelve in the final game against Malta. While both teams had the same goal difference (+16), Spain qualified having scored two more goals than the Netherlands. During the qualification stage for the 1986 World Cup the Netherlands finished in second place and advanced to the playoffs against neighbours Belgium. After losing the first leg 1–0 in Brussels, they held a 2–0 lead at Rotterdam with a few minutes remaining. Georges Grün's header in the 84th minute resulted in the Netherlands' elimination as Belgium advanced to the World Cup on away goals.

Rinus Michels returned, with his technical assistant Nol de Ruiter, to coach the team for Euro 1988 in West Germany. After losing the first group match against the Soviet Union 1–0, the Netherlands qualified for the semi-finals by defeating England 3–1 (with a hat-trick by Marco van Basten), and the Republic of Ireland 1–0. Van Basten scored against the hosts in the 89th minute to sink the German side, revenge for the 1974 World Cup. The Netherlands won the finals with a victory over the USSR with a header by Ruud Gullit and a volley by Van Basten. This was the national team's first major tournament win.

The Netherlands was one of the favourites for the 1990 World Cup tournament in Italy, but they scored only two goals in the group stage which featured England, Egypt and the Republic of Ireland. After finishing the group stage with identical records, the Netherlands and the Republic of Ireland drew lots to determine which team would finish second. The Netherlands had the tougher draw against West Germany, while the Republic of Ireland faced Romania. The match against West Germany is mostly remembered for the spitting incident involving Frank Rijkaard and Rudi Völler as the Netherlands were defeated 2–1.

The team reached the semi-finals in the Euro 1992 in Sweden, known for the emergence of Dennis Bergkamp. They were eliminated by eventual champions Denmark when Peter Schmeichel saved Van Basten's kick in the penalty shootout. This was Van Basten's last major tournament as he suffered a serious ankle injury shortly after, and eventually retired at age 30 in 1995. It was also the last hurrah for Rinus Michels, who returned for one finals spell in charge of the team before retiring for good after the tournament ended.

Dick Advocaat took over from Michels on the understanding that he would be replaced by Johan Cruyff the following year. But after talks between Cruyff and the KNVB broke down, Advocaat remained in charge of the national team for the World Cup. In the 1994 World Cup in the United States, Van Basten and striker Ruud Gullit were injured; Dennis Bergkamp led the team with three goals and the Netherlands advanced to the quarter-finals, where they lost 3–2 to eventual champions Brazil.

Second golden generation: 1996–2014

After finishing second in their Euro 1996 group, they played France in the quarter-finals. With the score 0-0, the match went to penalties. Clarence Seedorf's shot in the fourth round was stopped by French goalkeeper Bernard Lama, but the goal by Laurent Blanc eliminated the Netherlands. After they finished top of the qualifying group, they were drawn in Group E of the 1998 World Cup. With the Netherlands team featuring Dennis Bergkamp, Marc Overmars, Phillip Cocu, Edgar Davids, Frank de Boer, Ronald de Boer and Patrick Kluivert, they reached the semi-finals where they again lost on penalties, this time to Brazil. They then lost the third place playoff to Croatia. Soon afterwards, manager Guus Hiddink resigned to be replaced by Frank Rijkaard. The Netherlands co-hosted Euro 2000 with Belgium and won all three games in the group stage and then defeated FR Yugoslavia 6–1 in the quarter-finals. In the semi-finals, Italian goalkeeper Francesco Toldo made two penalty shootout saves to eliminate the Netherlands. The team failed to qualify for the 2002 World Cup after crucial losses to Portugal and the Republic of Ireland, prompting manager Louis van Gaal to resign.

Dick Advocaat became the national coach of the Netherlands for the second time in January 2002. His first match was a 1–1 draw against England in Rotterdam. The national team finished second place in their qualifying group for the 2004 Euro. Having to play in the playoffs after losing to the Czech Republic, they knocked out Scotland with a 6–0 win in the second leg to qualify for the 2004 tournament. The tournament saw the Netherlands make it to the semi-finals where they lost to the hosts in Portugal. Heavy criticism of his handling of the national team lead Advocaat to quit.

The Netherlands qualified for the 2006 World Cup under new manager Marco van Basten. They were eliminated in the second round after losing 1–0 to Portugal. The match produced 16 yellow cards, matching the World Cup record for most cautions in one game set in 2002, and set a new World Cup record of four red cards, two per side; it was nicknamed "the Battle of Nuremberg" by the press. Despite criticism surrounding his selection policy and the lack of attacking football from his team, Van Basten was offered a two-year extension to his contract by the KNVB. This allowed him to serve as national coach during Euro 2008 and the 2010 World Cup. The Netherlands qualified for Euro 2008, where they were drawn in the "Group of Death", together with France, Italy and Romania. They began with a 3–0 win over world champions Italy in Bern, their first victory over the Italians since 1978. They then beat France by 4–1 to qualify for the second round, and went on winning the group on nine points after beating Romania 2–0 with (mainly) their reserve players. However, they then lost in the quarter-finals to Guus Hiddink's Russia 3–1, with Ruud van Nistelrooy scoring an 86th-minute equaliser to force extra time, where the Russian scored twice. Following the tournament, Van Basten resigned having accepted the role at Ajax.

Under new coach Bert van Marwijk, the Netherlands went on to secure a 100% record in their World Cup 2010 qualification campaign, winning all their eight games to qualify for the World Cup. After they had comfortably qualified with maximum points in Group E and Slovakia in the round of 16, they took on Brazil in the quarter-finals. After trailing 1–0 at half-time, Wesley Sneijder scored two goals in the second half to advance the team to the semis where they beat Uruguay 3–2. They advanced to their first World Cup finals since 1978 but fell to Spain 1–0 after midfielder Andrés Iniesta scored in extra time. From August to September 2011, the team was ranked number one in the FIFA World Ranking, becoming the second national football team, after Spain, to top the ranking without previously winning a World Cup.

For Euro 2012, the Netherlands were placed in Group B with Germany, Portugal and Denmark, dubbed the tournament "Group of Death". The Netherlands lost all three of their group matches in a tournament for the first time in their history. Netherlands football legend Johan Cruyff criticised the team's star players for poor build up play and sloppy execution of the easy passes. Manager Bert van Marwijk resigned after the disappointment.

Louis van Gaal became the manager for the second time. In the 2014 World Cup UEFA qualifying round, the Netherlands won nine games and drew one, topping the group and earning automatic qualification. They were drawn into Group B, alongside Spain, Chile and Australia. The team avenged their 2010 defeat by defeating title holders Spain 5–1 in their opening match, with Robin van Persie scoring an impressive header to equalize in the 44th minute. Van Persie scored another, Arjen Robben scored a brace and Stefan de Vrij scored one.

After finishing top of Group B, the Netherlands defeated Mexico 2–1 in the round of 16, with Wesley Sneijder equalising late in the match and Klaas-Jan Huntelaar scoring a controversial penalty after a foul on Arjen Robben in stoppage time. In the quarter-finals, where they faced Costa Rica, the Netherlands had many shots on goal but could not score; the match finished in a 0–0 draw after extra time. The Netherlands won the ensuing penalty shootout 4–3. This was due in large part to backup goalkeeper Tim Krul who was brought on just before the end of extra time and made two saves. This marked the first time in World Cup history a goalkeeper was brought onto the field solely to participate in a shootout.

The semi-finals against Argentina saw the Netherlands having a decent chance to score from Arjen Robben while containing Lionel Messi as it remained scoreless after extra time. However, in penalty kicks, the Netherlands were eliminated 4–2, with Ron Vlaar and Wesley Sneijder having their spot kicks saved by Sergio Romero. The Netherlands won the third place match against hosts Brazil. Van Gaal, who successfully motivated the team after their semi-finals elimination, received praise for getting more out of the young and inexperienced Netherlands squad than many expected.

Decline and recovery: 2014–present
Guus Hiddink followed Van Gaal as manager for the Euro 2016 qualifying campaign. On 29 June 2015, Hiddink resigned and was succeeded by assistant Danny Blind. The Netherlands finished fourth in their group failing to qualify for the European Championship for the first time since 1984, and missing a major tournament for the first time since the 2002 World Cup. The team's poor form continued into the 2018 World Cup qualifiers, eventually resulting in Blind being dismissed after a 2–0 defeat to Bulgaria in March 2017. After the return of Dick Advocaat as coach, the Netherlands failed to qualify for the 2018 FIFA World Cup, finishing third in Group A behind France and Sweden.

In February 2018, Advocaat was replaced by Ronald Koeman, on a contract until the summer of 2022. The Netherlands qualified for League A in the UEFA Nations League which they would win to qualify for the final four after drawing with Germany on the last match day, beating France on the head-to-head record. The Netherlands beat England in the semi-finals of the Nations League, but lost 1–0 in the final against Portugal.

The Netherlands qualified for the UEFA Euro 2020 Championship on 16 November 2019 after drawing with Northern Ireland, marking their tenth participation in the UEFA Euro championship. Following the qualification, Ronald Koeman resigned from the team to coach FC Barcelona, eventually to be succeeded by Frank de Boer.

Without Ronald Koeman in charge, the Netherlands struggled in the new Nations League season, where they joined Poland, Bosnia and Herzegovina and Italy. The Netherlands won 1–0 at home by courtesy of Steven Bergwijn after a difficult game where Poland played very defensive against the Netherlands. However, also at the home ground, the Netherlands fell by the same score to Italy and lost their leading position to the Italians as well. Eventually, the Netherlands improved, and obtained important wins over Bosnia at home and Poland away, but a disappointing away draw to Bosnia proved crucial. Despite a strong display in their last group match against Italy, the match in Bergamo resulted in yet another draw. The Netherlands came within a point of progressing but eventually failed to acquire the ticket for the 2021 UEFA Nations League Finals.

With the coronavirus postponing Euro 2020 to 2021, the Netherlands played their group matches at home at the Johan Cruijff Arena in Amsterdam, beating Ukraine 3–2, Austria 2–0 and North Macedonia 3–0. However, the tournament ended in disappointment for the Netherlands once more, as they were beaten 2–0 by the Czech Republic in their Round of 16 tie in Budapest, after a Matthijs de Ligt red card. Two days later, De Boer left his position. He was replaced by Louis van Gaal, who came out of retirement to return for a third spell in charge of the side. On 16 November 2021, the Netherlands qualified for the 2022 World Cup after beating Norway 2–0 and topping their qualification group on the final day. In the 2022 World Cup, the Netherlands topped their group with 7 points. They progressed to the quarterfinals where they eventually lost to Argentina on penalties.

Team image

Kits and crest

The Netherlands national football team famously plays in bright orange shirts. Orange is the historic national colour of the Netherlands, originating from one of the many title of the ruling head of state, Prince of Orange. The current Netherlands away shirt is blue. The lion on the crest is the Netherlands' national and royal animal and has been on the crest since 1907 when they won 3–1 over Belgium.

Nike is the national team's kit provider, a sponsorship that began in 1996 and is contracted to continue until at least 2026. Before that the team was supplied by Adidas and Lotto.

Kit suppliers

Rivalries

Deeply rooted in anti-German sentiment due to the occupation of the Netherlands by Germany during World War II, the Netherlands' long-time football rival is Germany. Beginning in 1974, when the Netherlands lost the 1974 World Cup to West Germany in the finals, the rivalry between the two nations has become one of the best-known in international football.

To a lesser extent, the Netherlands maintains a rivalry with their other neighbour, Belgium; a Belgium–Netherlands fixture is referred to as a Low Countries derby. They have played in 126 matches  with the two competing against each other regularly between 1905 and 1964. This has diminished due to the rise of semi-professional football.

In recent years, the Netherlands has also developed a intercontinental rivalry with Argentina.

Media coverage
The Netherlands national football team matches have broadcast on Nederlandse Omroep Stichting which includes all friendlies, Nations League and World Cup qualifiers. The newest contract is a seven-year deal until 2027.

Home stadium

The Netherlands national team does not have a national stadium but plays mostly at the Johan Cruyff Arena in Amsterdam. It played host to its first Netherlands international game back in 1997, a 1998 World Cup qualification match against San Marino which the Netherlands won 4–0. It was formally called the Amsterdam Arena until 2018 when it was renamed in memory of Johan Cruyff.

Over the last few years, De Kuip in Rotterdam has hosted matches more regularly. Occasionally, matches take place at Philips Stadion in Eindhoven and the De Grolsch Veste in Enschede.

Results and fixtures

The following matches were played or are scheduled to be played by the national team in the past or in the upcoming 12 months. The time in the Netherlands is shown unless the match is in a different time zone.

2022

2023

Coaching staff

Coaching history

Players

Current squad
The following 25 players are part of the squad for the UEFA Euro 2024 qualifying against France and Gibraltar.

Caps and goals are correct as of 9 December 2022, after the match against Argentina.

Recent call-ups
The following players have also been called up for the team in the last twelve months.

INJ Player withdrew from the squad due to an injury.
FIT Player withdrew from the squad due to fitness concerns.
PRE Preliminary squad.
RET Player had announced retirement from national team.
SUS Player is serving a suspension.
PRI Player absent due to private circumstances.

Individual statistics

Player records

Players in bold text are still active with the Netherlands.

Most capped players

Top goalscorers

Manager records

 Most wins: Louis van Gaal, 40
 Longest reign: Bob Glendenning, 15 years
 Most tenures: Rinus Michels, 4 tenures

Team records

 Biggest win:
  11–0  (Eindhoven, Netherlands; 2 September 2011)

 Biggest defeat:
  12–2  (Darlington, England; 21 December 1907)

Competitive record

FIFA World Cup

The Netherlands' first two tournament appearances at the 1934 and the 1938 editions saw them lose their first round matches to Switzerland (1934) and Czechoslovakia (1938).

After not qualifying for the next six World Cups, they qualified for the 1974 FIFA World Cup in West Germany. There, with the use of Total Football tactics, they recorded their first win in World Cup competition against Uruguay. They qualified through to the second round where a win on the finals match day secured the Netherlands a spot in the finals. They lost to West Germany 2–1 with Gerd Müller scoring the winning goal for the Germany. The Netherlands once again made the 1978 FIFA World Cup finals with the team finishing second in the group behind Peru. After finishing top of the all-European group in the second round, they met Argentina in the finals. Argentina protested René van de Kerkhof's forearm plaster cast. After that protest, the game went to extra time where Argentina won 3–1 after scoring two goals in extra time.

The 1990 edition saw the Netherlands not win a single game throughout the tournament, scoring only two goals in the group stage. After finishing with an identical record with the Republic of Ireland, they were split by drawing of lots. The Netherlands took on West Germany losing 2–1 in Milan. 1994 saw the Netherlands knocked out in the quarter-finals stage as they lost to eventual champions Brazil with Branco's brutal free-kick sending them out. After qualifying from their group with five points, the Netherlands made the semi-finals of the 1998 edition where they once again lost to the Brazilians. This time it was by penalties; Phillip Cocu and Ronald de Boer's shots missed the goal to give Brazil a spot in the finals. The Netherlands went on to finish in fourth place after losing to Croatia in the third place playoff.

In 2006, the Netherlands made it to the round of 16 where, in what was called the "Battle of Nuremberg" they lost by a single goal to Portugal. The Netherlands were given seven yellow cards. The following edition, in 2010, saw the team qualify to the knockout stage by finishing atop Group E. After defeating Slovakia 2–1 in the round of 16, they came back from an early goal by Robinho to defeat Brazil 2–1 in the quarter-finals as Wesley Sneijder scored a double. In the semi-finals, they defeated Uruguay in a tough game for the Netherlands, making their first World Cup finals since 1978. In the finals, they took on Spain. During normal time, the Netherlands had plenty of chances to win the game, the closest being in the 62nd minute when Sneijder shot wide. Spain's winning goal came off a play in the 116th minute after the Netherlands went down to ten men.

In 2014, the Netherlands finish atop Group B with wins over Spain, Australia and Chile. In the round of 16 match against Mexico, the Netherlands came back from a goal down to manage a 2–1 win in stoppage time with Klaas-Jan Huntelaar scoring a controversial penalty. In the quarter-finals, they defeated Costa Rica on penalties however they lost to Argentina on penalties in the semi-finals. The Netherlands took bronze in the tournament after defeating hosts nations Brazil 3–0 in the third place playoff.p

UEFA European Championship

Olympic Games

UEFA Nations League

FIFA Ranking
Last update was on 16 November 2021.
Source:
The FIFA/Coca-Cola World Ranking - Associations - Netherlands - Men's - FIFA.com

 Worst Ranking   Best Ranking   Worst Mover   Best Mover

Honours

Official
 FIFA World Cup
  Runners-up (3): 1974, 1978, 2010
  Third place (1): 2014

 UEFA European Championship
  Champions (1): 1988
  Third place (4): 1976, 1992, 2000, 2004

 UEFA Nations League
  Runners-up (1): 2019

 Olympic Games
  Bronze medal (3): 1908, 1912, 1920

See also

 Netherlands national under-21 football team
 Netherlands national under-19 football team
 Netherlands national under-17 football team

Footnotes

References

External links

  
 voetbalstats.nl – statistics of the national football team 
 UEFA profile
 FIFA profile
 Netherlands internationals at the RSSSF archive
 Netherlands managers at the RSSSF archive

Netherlands national football team
1905 establishments in the Netherlands
European national association football teams
UEFA European Championship-winning countries
Football teams in the Netherlands
Association football clubs established in 1905